Philip John Boyer (born 25 January 1949) is an English former footballer who played for various clubs during his career, including Southampton, Norwich City, AFC Bournemouth and Manchester City. He has the rare distinction of having played over 100 league games for four clubs. He also made one appearance for England.

Career

Early career
Born in Nottingham, Boyer attended Musters Road School, Nottingham, from where he joined Derby County as a trainee in August 1965. Although he signed as a professional in November 1966, manager Brian Clough allowed him to leave the Baseball Ground in July 1968, without having made a first team appearance.

York City
After completing his apprenticeship with Derby County, Boyer moved to York City in July 1968 for a fee of £3,000. In 125 appearances, Boyer scored 34 times but played an important role in creating opportunities for forward partner Ted MacDougall, with whom he was later to play at three other clubs. At the end of his first season at Bootham Crescent, York successfully applied for re-election to the Fourth Division, and their fortunes then gradually improved and they achieved promotion at the end of the 1970–71 season (after Boyer had left).

AFC Bournemouth
After his teammate moved to Bournemouth & Boscombe Athletic, it was only a matter of time before Cherries manager John Bond signed Boyer as well, and he successfully offered £20,000 for Boyer in December 1970. Like the club he had just left, Bournemouth were also promoted (as runners-up) from the Fourth Division at the end of his first season at Dean Court, with Boyer scoring 11 league goals in 23 appearances as he once again linked up with MacDougall.

The following season, Bournemouth finished in third place in Division 3, narrowly missing a second successive promotion, with Boyer ever-present, scoring 15 goals and helping MacDougall to score 35.

Norwich City
When Bond moved to Norwich City in November 1973, he reunited the pair. He signed MacDougall from West Ham almost immediately and then signed Boyer from Bournemouth for £145,000 in February 1974. He made his Canaries debut against Sheffield United at Carrow Road on 9 February 1974.

The end of the 1973–74 season saw Norwich relegated in last place, but the following season Bond guided them back to the top flight at the first attempt, and also to the 1975 League Cup Final, which they lost 1–0 to Aston Villa at Wembley.

The Boyer/MacDougall partnership was not quite so prolific at Norwich (although on a higher level), with Boyer scoring 16 goals in 1974–75 (to MacDougall's 17) and 11 in 1975–76 (to MacDougall's 23).

Boyer made two England under-23 appearances before manager Don Revie called him into the senior national squad and gave him his only full cap, in a 2–1 victory over Wales on 24 March 1976, thus becoming Norwich City's first English cap.

In all he made 137 appearances for Norwich City, scoring 40 goals.

Southampton
In August 1977, Lawrie McMenemy, who was building a team to gain promotion back to Division 1, signed Boyer (for a fee of £130,000) for Southampton, who MacDougall had joined a year earlier. Boyer had the task of replacing Mick Channon, who had been sold to Manchester City. He made his debut at the same time as Chris Nicholl and Mike Pickering, in a team that also included Alan Ball, Nick Holmes and Steve Williams.

Boyer enjoyed a superb first season with the Saints, netting 17 goals in 41 league games. Included in this total were doubles against Burnley, Notts County, Bristol Rovers and Blackburn Rovers, all these games being played at the Dell. His goals, together with MacDougall's 14, helped Southampton to promotion to the First Division as runners-up in Division 2 at the end of the 1977–78 season.

Although he played in every league game, he struggled for goals in the top flight during the 1978–79 season, scoring seven, as well as losing his strike partner MacDougall, who had returned to Bournemouth in November 1978. On 17 March 1979, Boyer again appeared on the losing side in a League Cup final, as Southampton lost 2–3 to Nottingham Forest.

His most memorable game for Southampton came as they gained revenge against Nottingham Forest on 10 November 1979. Forest, then reigning European champions, were unable to cope with Boyer and Mick Channon up front and suffered their worst defeat since Brian Clough took charge four years earlier. They had a chance of winning a point when Garry Birtles brought them back into the match at 2–1 in the 56th minute, but Boyer struck twice in seven minutes to complete a memorable 4–1 victory. Boyer's second goal completed a five-man, six-touch move and the shot left goalkeeper Peter Shilton stranded from a Channon cross.

In the 1979–80 season he collected the fine return of 23 goals from 42 games (again ever-present) to finish as Division One's leading scorer. This tally included hat-tricks against Derby County, Crystal Palace and Brighton & Hove Albion. Though he only scored one goal away from The Dell, at Anfield in a 1–1 draw with Liverpool on 12 January 1980.

Despite this return he was on his way out of the club just months later following the arrival of Kevin Keegan.

In his three and a bit seasons at The Dell, he made a total of 162 appearances for The Saints, scoring 61 goals.

Manchester City
In November 1980, he joined Manchester City for a fee of £220,000. His career at Manchester City was blighted by injury and he only made a handful of appearances, and suffered the heart-break of missing out on the 1981 FA Cup Final due to injury.

Later career
In February 1982 he moved to Hong Kong, where he played for Bulova on-loan.

He then joined Grantham after returning to the Nottingham area, something of a major coup for new manager, Bob Duncan. His debut came in the September 1983 in a Northern Premier League game at Horwich RMI, with his first goal coming the following week at home to Mossley.

He left Grantham towards the end of their time in the NPL to have short spells at Stamford and Shepshed Charterhouse, before Barry Shaw brought him back to Grantham as his assistant during the 1985–86 season. His last goal for Grantham came in the April 1987 league defeat at Bridgnorth Town, with his final appearance for the club in the closing fixture of the season against Banbury United.

Boyer briefly followed Barry Shaw in a management role at Harrowby United.

Personal life
Since retiring from playing he has worked as a bank courier and also scouted for various Football League clubs, including Northampton and Blackpool.

Honours

Club
Norwich City
Football League Cup runner-up: 1975

Southampton
Football League Cup runner-up: 1979

References

1949 births
Living people
Footballers from Nottingham
English footballers
England international footballers
England under-23 international footballers
Association football forwards
First Division/Premier League top scorers
Derby County F.C. players
York City F.C. players
AFC Bournemouth players
Norwich City F.C. players
Southampton F.C. players
Manchester City F.C. players
Bulova SA players
Shepshed Dynamo F.C. players
Stamford A.F.C. players
Grantham Town F.C. players
English Football League players
Hong Kong First Division League players